A lugat or liogat is a vampire-like being in Albanian mythology. They abide in shadows and darkness, especially places that never see sunlight, such as inside water wells, old ruins, and caves. They have a frightening visage and are extremely violent. A lugat can fly and ride the winds, and assails his victims in their sleep. He also lures people, especially children, to himself while he is concealed in darkness. In Albanian, the word llugat is also used to describe a wicked or frightening person.

Sources

Citations

Bibliography

Albanian folklore